Sekolah Menengah Kebangsaan Bandar Tun Hussein Onn (2) (or SMKBTHO (2)), sometimes referred as SMK Bandar Tun Hussein Onn (2) (although there were never another school of the same name before it), is a secondary school in the state of Selangor, Malaysia. It is the only secondary school in the Bandar Tun Hussein Onn suburb.

The school is located in the city of South Cheras, in the district of Hulu Langat and under the subdistrict of Balakong.

The school is most famous for the success of Yashwin Sarawanan in Asia's Got Talent (season 3).

History
SMK Bandar Tun Hussein Onn was established in December 2003 and began its first session on January 1, 2004. Its first principal was Datin Azmah Abd Aziz, who retired in December 2007. The school consists of four 3-storey building blocks. The school has double sessions; the morning sessions starts from 7.20 am and ends at 1.05 pm. The afternoon session, which started in 2006, begins at 1.05 pm till 6.45 pm.

In 2009, two new building blocks were completed.

The majority of students came from SK Bandar Tun Hussein Onn, SK Bandar Tun Hussein Onn 2, SK Alam Damai, SK Desa Baiduri, SK Cheras Jaya 1 and SK Batu Sembilan.

Administration
The administrators as of 2011 are:

Principal
 Datin Azmah Abd Aziz (Jan 2004 - Dec 2007) (retired)
 Puan Sri Datin Mazlilah Ahmad Mansur (Feb 2008–2013) (retired)
 Tuan Haji Hasan Che Ling (March 2014-April 2017) (retired)

Senior Assistant of Academic Curriculum
 Pn Rozita Ahmad (Jan 2004 - Oct 2007) (promoted to principal in SMK Cheras Jaya)
 Pn Zainariah Ahmad Yusop (Jan 2008–April 2015) (promoted to deputy district education officer's office)

Senior Assistant of Student Affairs
 (Jan 2004 - Dec 2008) (switch to Senior Assistant)
 Pn Mahani Jusoh (Jan 2008 - Dec 2008) (resigned, back to becoming a teacher)
 Tuan Abdul Wahab Tuan Shafee

Senior Assistant of Co-Curricular Activities
 En Mohd Ridzuan Abdullah (Jan 2004–present)

Facilities
SMKBTHO consists of:
 six building blocks, assembly area, canteen, field, two changing rooms,"asataka" Anjung Bestari, "asataka" Junjung Kasih
 administration office, staff room, meeting room, surau (translate: musolla), two event halls, bookshop,
 34 classrooms, four cabin-type classrooms, six science laboratory (one Biology, one Chemistry, one Physics, three Science), five Living Skills Workshops (carpentry, engines, pipeworks, sewing and cooking)
 one library,  one language room, Art Studio, four Computer Laboratory, Mathematics Room, Heritage room for History and Geography studies,
 Discipline room, Counselling Room, Prefects Operations Room, Sick bay.

Academics

Penilaian Menengah Rendah 
SMKBTHO(2) reached the top 10 school ranking of Hulu Langat within four years of establishment, making it the fastest rising school in Hulu Langat. As after PMR 2007, SMKBTHO(2) ranked 7th.

The school's best accomplishment in public examinations are of PMR 2009, where 74 students achieved straight A results (9A and 8A for Muslim students, 7A for non-Muslim students) and 87.5% of exam-takers passed.

In 2007, there were 64 straight A results with a passing percentage of 86.65% while in 2008, there were 68 straight A results with a passing rate of 84.5%.

Organisations
The major organisations in SMKBTHO(2) are:
 Prefectorial Board - white attire and maroon blazers,
 Librarians - yellow attire and brown vest,
 Counselling Buddies - purple attire and dark purple vest,
 ICT Prefects Institution - white attire, black pants with black cardigan,
 Cooperation Board - brown attire, black pants

Disciplinary Board
School discipline is mainly run by prefects and discipline teachers. The uniform for male prefects is a white long sleeve shirt, white trouser and a maroon blazer. The official uniform for female prefects is a white long sleeve blouse, maroon long skirt and a maroon blazer; they can wear white baju kurung with a maroon kain kurung on unofficial occasions.

The number of prefects is 120+ per year, which is about 5% of the school population. The prefects are chosen through interviews by the SMKBTHO(2) Prefects Board and approved by the Acting Advisor, rather than the meritocracy method.

The prefects organisation in SMKBTHO(2) is mainly governed by the SMKBTHO(2) Prefects Board which consists of 10 to 16 members at a time. The Prefects Council is led by a Head Boy and a Head Girl. The major components in the council (the primary members) are the Head Boy, Head Girl, Assistant Head Prefects, Honorary Secretary, Honorary Treasurer and the Head of Bureaus, which consists Bureaus of the Discipline Enforcement, Assembly Management, Internal Affairs, Protocols & Events, Statistics and Prefects Operation Room Care (was established in year 2010 during Abdul Rahman Azman Shah as the Head Prefect).

There are also Junior Head of Bureaus (called secondary members), a group of unofficial members of the Council consisting of junior prefects trained to take over the prefects administrations in the future.

A few teachers (discipline teachers) has been given mandate to carry a rattan cane, and are allowed to cane students.

ICT Prefects Institution
Main Ideas: ICT Prefects Institution was initiated 2010. This institution is mainly run by the ICT Prefects and monitored by the ICT teachers.

Administration: The ICT Prefects in SMKBTHO is mainly governed by the ICT Prefects Institution which consists of nine members at a time. The ICT Prefects Institution is mainly led by the Head ICT Prefect. The primary members of this institution are the Head ICT Prefect, Assistant Head ICT Prefect, Honorary Secretary,  Assistant Secretary,  Honorary Treasurer and the Head of Units, which consists Computer Networking Unit (URK), Website Unit,  Graphic Unit.

ICT Coordinator:
 En. Noorman bin Sa'at

ICT Lab and responsible ICT Teachers:
 Al-Khawarizmi Lab: Pn. Norhana bt Yahya
 Al-Farabi: Pn. Nurul Azilah bt Resely
 Al-Biruni: Pn. Sabrina bt Stambul
 Al-Kindi: En. Noorman bin Sa'at

Head ICT Prefect:
 Mohd Hafizul Afifi bin Abdullah (2010–2011)
 Muhammad Norhisham bin Ruslan (2012)

Projects by the ICT Prefects Institution:
 Official Portal of SMKBTHO2
 E-Learning Portal (in collaboration with alumni)

Uniform: The uniform for male ICT prefects is a white long sleeve T-shirt (Monday), black trousers and a black cardigan. The official uniform for female prefects is a white long sleeve T-shirt, back long skirt and a black blazer; however they are allowed to wear white baju kurung with a black kain kurung on unofficial occasions.

Library
Coordinator: Pn Norlaili Khairudin

The library of SMKBTHO is named as Pusat Sumber ZA'BA.

Co-curricular activities 
SMKBTHO's co-curriculum unit is led by Senior Assistant of Co-curricular Activities, En Ridzuan Abdullah. The school's co-curricular unit's motto is Siap Siaga (Always Ready).

The school co-curricular units are:
 Uniform: Kadet Remaja Sekolah, Kadet Polis, Persatuan Bulan Sabit Merah (Red Crescent Society), Puteri Islam, Pengakap (Scouts), Pandu Puteri (Girl Guides)
 Academics and Hobbies: Persatuan Bahasa Melayu, English Language Society, Mathematics Club, Science Club, Persatuan Pendidikan Islam, Kelab Seni Visual, Kelab Kemahiran Hidup, Kelab Pencegah Jenayah, Kelab Komputer, Kelab Fotografi, Kelab Landskap, Kelab Warisan, Kelab Geografi, Kelab Sejarah, Kelab Rukun Negara, Kelab Kebudayaan
 Sports: football, volleyball, netball, badminton, Sepak Takraw, table tennis, chess, quartermaster

The school sports houses are:
 Suadamai: blue
 Suakasih: yellow
 Suarasa: red
 Suaindah: green
 Suasana: purple

Achievements
 Sports
The volleyball team has notable players that include Muhammad Aizat Abd Karim who represented Hulu Langat in the state-level under-15 tournament of 2007, and Faliq Ajir, who represented Selangor in the national levels of under-18 tournaments in 2007.

In the 2007 district-level chess tournament, Yeep Ka Young ranked 8th of entire Hulu Langat in the under-18 male category.
 Uniform Units

The most active unit in SMK Bandar Tun Hussein Onn is the Kadet Remaja Sekolah. They have organised the most outdoor events of all uniform units in SMKBTHO. The KRS has a close relationship with the Kadet Polis.

In 2007, at the age of 15, Cadet Staff Sergeant Siti Sarah Dzulkifli were bestowed "Hulu Langat's Best KRS Marching Commander" during a district-level marching competition. She also became the youngest at the school to achieve the highest national cadet rank, 1st Cadet Warrant Officer.

In 2010, Scouts 61 troop (SMK Bandar Tun Hussein Onn) has produced ten King's Scouts which is the highest achievement in scouting. Scouts has been named as the most active and the best Uniform Unit for that year.

In 2011, Scouts 61 troop produced another ten King's Scouts.

Notable faculty/students

Faculty 
 Puan Sri Datin Mazlilah Ahmad Mansur, Principal - wife of Ex-Director-General of Education Malaysia.

Students 

Yashwin Sarawanan, winner of Asia's Got Talent (season 3).

Yashwin Sarawanan 
In 2019, Yashwin Sarawanan, from SMK Bandar Tun Hussein Onn, became the runner-up to the popular Asia's Got Talent (season 3), created from the famous Got Talent franchise by Simon Cowell. The then Principal, Tuan Haji Hasan Che Ling promoted him to Ikon Sekolah (School Icon).

Schools in Selangor